Pan American Band Instrument Company was a musical instrument manufacturing company headquartered in Elkhart, Indiana.  Elkhart  has been known as "The Musical Instrument Capital of the World". The company existed between 1917 and ca. 1930, when it was absorbed by its parent company C.G. Conn Ltd.

History

The company was founded in 1917 by Carl Dimond Greenleaf, (July 27, 1876, Wauseon, Ohio - July 10, 1959, Elkhart, Indiana) who was president of C.G. Conn.  Greenleaf was expanding Conn's production of musical instruments, seeking to develop the amateur and educational markets for musical instruments, and developing retail sales distribution to expand Conn's sales channels beyond their mail-order business.  Formation of the new instrument manufacturing company was the foundation of Conn's effort to develop the student and amateur markets. In 1919, Pan American's production was moved to the former Angledile Scale Company factory which was also owned by Conn.  The factory produced Pan American branded instruments as well as blank instruments to be sold under merchandisers' "stencil" brands. Conn also founded the Continental Music distributing company in 1923 to establish its retail presence across the United States.  After about 1930, PABIC was absorbed by its parent company Conn.  Use of the Pan American trademark for Conn's second-line instruments continued until 1955. Cavalier and Continental Colonial were other trademarks for second-line instruments sold through Conn's main channels.

References
Banks, Margaret Downie, "A Brief History of the Conn Company (1874-present)," National Music Museum, Vermillion, South Dakota
Elkhart city directories (available Elkhart Public Library)
New Grove Music Dictionary ("Conn")
McMakin, Dean "Musical Instrument Manufacturing in Elkhart, Indiana" (unpublished typescript, 1987, available at Elkhart Public Library)
Reed, Charles Vandeveer, "A History of Band Instrument Manufacturing in Elkhart, Indiana," unpublished MS Thesis, Butler University, 1953, 90p.

Musical instrument manufacturing companies of the United States
Companies based in Elkhart County, Indiana
American companies established in 1917
Manufacturing companies established in 1917
Manufacturing companies disestablished in 1928
1917 establishments in Indiana
1920s disestablishments in Indiana
Defunct manufacturing companies based in Indiana